Keller Peninsula is a high peninsula separating Mackellar Inlet and Martel Inlet in Admiralty Bay, on King George Island, in the South Shetland Islands of Antarctica. The name Keller was applied by the French Antarctic Expedition under Jean-Baptiste Charcot, who charted Admiralty Bay in December 1909.

Station G
Keller Peninsula was the location of the British research Station G. The first hut was built on January 18, 1947 and a second was constructed on February 14, 1948 and moved to Signy Island in 1950. A hut, known as Sparrow House, was built on January 28, 1949 and a third was established on January 6, 1956. The researchers  had the tasks of the searching in the fields of meteorology, glaciology and geology. The station was inhabited in the austral summer 1947 and from January 1948 to January 19, 1961. The buildings were demolished from July 1995 to February 1996 by members of the Brazilian Antarctic Expedition of the nearby Comandante Ferraz Antarctic Station.

See also
 List of Antarctic research stations
 List of Antarctic field camps
 Crime in Antarctica
 Plaza Point

References

Peninsulas of King George Island (South Shetland Islands)